Botshabelo, meaning "a place of refuge", is a large township set up in 1979 by the then apartheid government.  It is located 45 km east of Bloemfontein in the present-day  Free State province of South Africa. Botshabelo is now the largest township in Free State.

History
As many people moved away from the farms in the Free State, they looked for places to stay in the region of Thaba Nchu, another homeland under the old Bophutatswana government.

The policy governing Bophutatswana at the time clearly stated that Bophutatswana belongs to those who are of Tswana tribe. As a result, all other tribes, mainly Sotho and Xhosa, were housed at a squatter camp named “Kromdraai”. Kromdraai was initiated by a man who was only referred to as "Khoza". He was selling a stand for only 50 cents around the year of 1976.

Later on the government of Bophutatswana started to strongly condemn the development of that area and worked hard through their police force during the day and night, striving to dispatch everybody living in the region and who is not a Tswana. As the pressure mounted for the people of Kromdraai, Khoza fled and he was no longer to be seen.

In 1979, the then Prime Minister of QwaQwa, Kenneth Mopeli together with the apartheid government found a place for all the people of Kromdraai at a farm called Onverwacht. All the people who were not Tswana started to move to Onverwacht for free, and later on when they started to settle in the area paid ZAR80 for a stand. Late in 1980 to early 1981 the name Onverwacht started to disappear and people started to call their place by the name of Botshabelo, this name given by Julius Nkoko.

Economy
Botshabelo has a large industrial park with large companies located there. The economy of this township is based on production of food, clothing and other goods. The poultry producing company [Supreme poultry Pty (Ltd)] is located here.  Capitec Bank and Shoprite has three branches and supermarkets in this township respectively.

Transport
Botshabelo is served by 'Interstate Bus Lines' commuter buses and 'Big Sky Coaches', both traveling local and long distances on a daily basis. The township is located on the main railway line between Bloemfontein and Maseru, as well as on the main road between the two towns. The township still has unnamed streets, but the development of upgrading and naming of streets and roads are underway. There is also a new taxi rank at the newly built Botshabelo Mall.

Shopping
Botshabelo has a new regional shopping mall near the industrial park. The mall is anchored by Shoprite,Pick n Pay, Cashbuild, Truworths and Foschini Group stores. This new shopping destination has over 80 stores including banks and restaurants like KFC and Hungry Lion. The mall is owned by the Liberty Property Group and Khora investments. It is located at Cnr N8 road & Jazzman Mokhothu highway. Other shopping centres are: Northern centre, Shoprite centre, Addy's Plaza, and Rea-hola shopping centre also known as Fairways.

Education
Botshabelo has over 65 primary and secondary schools. Motheo FET College has a satellite campus in this township.

Sports
Botshabelo is one of the towns that have produced soccer players for the Premier Soccer League (PSL), especially for Bloemfontein Celtics, players such as James Madidilane, Ditheko Mototo, the late Abram Raselemane, Ntho Moshe, Motseothata November, Ace Gulwa, Lefu Nyapuli, Moeketsi Sekola, Teboho Salemane and others. Kaizer Sebothelo Stadium is the main sporting venue in Botshabelo with a capacity of 20 000 seats, including a sporting arena where indoor sports are played, as well as a newly revamped recreational swimming pool open to the public.
And also there is a Football Tournament That has been established by Ba2cada namely BA2CADA Soccer tournament taking place at Section "H”

Notable people
Fikile Mbalula, politician, born in Botshabelo
Nyakallo Leine ba2cada radio personality

References

External links

Populated places in Mangaung
Townships in the Free State (South African province)